Bersagliere was the name of at least threec ships of the Italian Navy and may refer to:

 , a  launched in 1906 and discarded in 1923.
 , a  launched in 1938 and sunk in 1943.
 , a  launched in 1985 and decommissioned in 2018.

Italian Navy ship names